The 2021 America East Conference softball tournament was held at the Diamond at UMBC on the campus of the University of Maryland, Baltimore County in Baltimore, Maryland from May 13 through May 15, 2021. The tournament was won by the UMBC Retrievers, who earned the America East Conference's automatic bid to the 2021 NCAA Division I softball tournament

Tournament

Bracket

References

America East Conference softball tournament
America East Conference softball tournament
Sports competitions in Baltimore
Softball in Maryland
2020s in Baltimore